Rotherham Metropolitan Borough Council is the local authority of the Metropolitan Borough of Rotherham in South Yorkshire, England. It is a metropolitan district council, one of four in South Yorkshire and one of 36 in the metropolitan counties of England. The council was created by the Local Government Act 1972.

In February 2015 the elected council had its powers suspended and transferred to commissioners appointed by HM Government after it was severely criticised by the Casey report into the Rotherham child sexual exploitation scandal. Power is being returned to the council in phases, with the council expected to fully regain its powers by March 2019.

History
The current local authority was first elected in 1973, a year before formally coming into its powers and prior to the creation of the Metropolitan Borough of Rotherham on 1 April 1974. The council gained borough status, entitling it to be known as Rotherham Metropolitan Borough Council.

It was envisaged through the Local Government Act 1972 that Rotherham as a metropolitan local authority would share power with the South Yorkshire County Council. The split of powers and functions meant that the South Yorkshire County Council was responsible for "wide area" services such as fire, ambulance and waste disposal with the district authorities responsible for "personal" services such as social care, libraries, education and refuse collection. This arrangement lasted until 1986 when Rotherham Metropolitan Borough Council gained responsibility for some services that had been provided by the South Yorkshire County Council. The Local Government Act 1985 directed the councils of South Yorkshire to form joint arrangements, which are coordinated by the South Yorkshire Joint Secretariat, in order to deliver these functions.

Powers and functions
The local authority derives its powers and functions from the Local Government Act 1972 and subsequent legislation. For the purposes of local government, Rotherham is within a metropolitan area of England. It provides the majority of local government services in Rotherham, including Council Tax billing, libraries, social services, processing planning applications, waste collection and disposal, and it is a local education authority. The council appoints members to South Yorkshire Fire and Rescue Authority, the South Yorkshire Police and Crime Panel and it is a constituent council of the Sheffield City Region Combined Authority.

Political control

Councillors are elected from 25 wards. Each ward returns two or three members, giving a total of 59 councillors.

Elections to Rotherham Metropolitan Borough Council were last held on 6 May 2021. Although Labour retained control of the council, the Conservatives went from zero to 20 seats at this election.

In December 2021, there were two by-elections in Anston and Woodsetts and Aughton and Swallownest, both Conservative defences. They failed to defend both of them, with the former going Liberal Democrat and the latter going Labour.

Commissioners
In February 2015 the elected council was suspended and replaced by commissioners appointed by the government after it was severely criticised by the Casey report into the Rotherham child sexual exploitation scandal.  The commissioners were later named as Sir Derek Myers (lead commissioner), Stella Manzie (managing director commissioner), Malcolm Newsam (children's social care commissioner), Mary Ney and Julie Kenny (supporting commissioners).  The Secretary of State for Communities and Local Government, Eric Pickles, said that they would remain in charge of the council until March 2019, though he expected that there would be a "phased roll back of powers to the authority as and when there can be confidence that the authority could exercise a function in compliance with the best value duty, and in the case of children's social care, to the required standard."

See also
 South Yorkshire Police and Crime Commissioner
 Shaun Wright

References

External links
Council website

Metropolitan district councils of England
Local authorities in South Yorkshire
Leader and cabinet executives
Local education authorities in England
Billing authorities in England
1974 establishments in England
Borough Council